List of military units raised by the state of Indiana during the American Civil War.

Artillery units

Cavalry

Note: Cavalry regiments also had infantry designations.

1st Indiana Cavalry Regiment (28th Infantry)
2nd Indiana Cavalry Regiment (41st Infantry)
3rd  Indiana Cavalry Regiment (45th Infantry)
East Wing (Army of the Potomac)
West Wing (Army of the Ohio)
4th Indiana Cavalry Regiment (77th Infantry)
5th Indiana Cavalry Regiment (90th Infantry)
6th Indiana Cavalry Regiment (71st Infantry)
7th Indiana Cavalry Regiment (119th Infantry)
8th Indiana Cavalry Regiment (39th Infantry)
9th Indiana Cavalry Regiment (121st Infantry)
10th Indiana Cavalry Regiment (125th Infantry)
11th Indiana Cavalry Regiment (126th Infantry)
12th Indiana Cavalry Regiment (127th Infantry)
13th Indiana Cavalry Regiment (131st Infantry)
Stewart's Independent Cavalry Company
Bracken's Independent Cavalry Company
Independent Company Mounted Scouts

Infantry
Note: The 1st, 2nd, 3rd, 4th and 5th  Regiments Indiana Volunteer Infantry were units that served in the Mexican–American War.

See also

Lists of American Civil War units by state

Sources
The Civil War Archive, Union Regimental Index: Indiana
Dyer, Frederick H. (1959). A Compendium of the War of the Rebellion. New York and London. Thomas Yoseloff, Publisher. .
 Holloway, William R. (2004). Civil War Regiments from Indiana. eBookOnDisk.com Pensacola, Florida. .

Notes 

 
Indiana
Indiana-related lists